Plzeň municipal election in 2010 was held as part of Czech municipal elections, 2010. It was held on 16 and 17 October 2010. The Civic Democratic Party has won the election ahead of the Czech Social Democratic Party. Both parties received 14 seats in 47-seat assembly and formed grand coalition. Martin Baxa became the new Mayor. The incumbent Mayor Pavel Rödl was a former member of ODS. He left the party prior election and contested as a leader of  Citizens.cz.

Results

References

External links
 Results

2010
2010 elections in the Czech Republic